Nokia SU-33W is a Nokia's Mobile TV Receiver. With this optional DVB-H (Digital Video Broadcasting for Handheld) 
it is possible to watch television on the screen of the phone. Many Nokia mobile phones with Bluetooth are compatible.

This functionality is integrated into Nokia N92, Nokia N77 and Nokia N96 mobile phones and Nokia 5330 Mobile TV Edition features DVB-T too.

A 1seg version of this is also available in some South American countries and sold as SU-33Wb (using the SBTVD standard).

Compatible Nokia phones 
 Nokia 5230
 Nokia 5235
 Nokia 5530 XpressMusic
 Nokia 5800 XpressMusic
 Nokia 6220 classic
 Nokia E6
 Nokia E75
 Nokia N73
 Nokia N79
 Nokia N85
 Nokia N86 8MP
 Nokia N97
 Nokia N97 mini
 Nokia X6
 Nokia C6-01
 Nokia C5-03

References

External links 
 

SU33W